Prionocyphon discoideus is a species of marsh beetle in the family Scirtidae. It is found in North America.

References

Further reading

 

Scirtoidea
Articles created by Qbugbot
Beetles described in 1825